The ice hockey team rosters at the 1984 Winter Olympics consisted of the following players:

Austria
Thomas Cijan, Rick Cunningham, Konrad Dorn, Johann Fritz, Fritz Ganster, Kelly Greenbank, Kurt Harand, Bernard Hutz, Rudolf König, Helmut Koren, Edward Lebler, Giuseppe Mion, Helmut Petrik, Martin Platzer, Herbert Pöck, Peter Raffl, Michael Rudman, Kuno Sekulic, Leopold Sivec

Canada
Warren Anderson, Robin Bartel, Russ Courtnall, J. J. Daigneault, Kevin Dineen, Dave Donnelly, Bruce Driver, Darren Eliot, Patrick Flatley, Dave Gagner, Mario Gosselin, Vaughn Karpan, Doug Lidster, Darren Lowe, Kirk Muller, James Patrick, Craig Redmond, Dave Tippett, Carey Wilson, Dan Wood

Czechoslovakia
Jaroslav Benák, Vladimír Caldr, František Černík, Milan Chalupa, Miloslav Hořava, Jiří Hrdina, Arnold Kadlec, Jaroslav Korbela, Jiří Králík, Vladimír Kýhos, Jiří Lála, Igor Liba, Vincent Lukáč, Dušan Pašek, Pavel Richter, Vladimír Růžička, Dárius Rusnák, Jaromír Šindel, Radoslav Svoboda, Eduard Uvíra

Finland
Raimo Helminen, Risto Jalo, Arto Javanainen, Timo Jutila, Erkki Laine, Markus Lehto, Petteri Lehto, Pertti Lehtonen, Jarmo Mäkitalo, Anssi Melametsä, Hannu Oksanen, Arto Ruotanen, Simo Saarinen, Ville Sirén, Arto Sirviö, Petri Skriko, Raimo Summanen, Kari Takko, Harri Tuohimaa, Jorma Valtonen

Italy
John Bellio, Marco Capone, Gerard Ciarcia, Roberto De Piero, Cary Farelli, Norbert Gasser, Grant Goegan, Adolf Insam, Fabrizio Kasslatter, Erwin Kostner, Michael Mair, Mike Mastrullo, Lodovico Migliore, Thomas Milani, Gino Pasqualotto, Martin Pavlu, Constant Priondolo, Norbert Prünster, Adriano Tancon, David Tomassoni

Norway
Trond Abrahamsen, Cato Hamre Andersen, Arne Bergseng, Åge Ellingsen, Stephen Foyn, Jørn Goldstein, Øystein Jarlsbo, Roy Johansen, Jon-Magne Karlstad, Erik Kristiansen, Per-Arne Kristiansen, Sven Lien, Øivind Løsåmoen, Ørjan Løvdal, Jim Marthinsen, Geir Myhre, Erik Nerell, Bjørn Skaare, Petter Thoresen, Frank Vestreng

Poland
Janusz Adamiec, Marek Cholewa, Andrzej Chowaniec, Jerzy Christ, Henryk Gruth, Andrzej Hachuła, Leszek Jachna, Wiesław Jobczyk, Stanisław Klocek, Andrzej Nowak, Włodzimierz Olszewski, Jan Piecko, Gabriel Samolej, Krystian Sikorski, Jan Stopczyk, Ludwik Synowiec, Robert Szopiński, Andrzej Ujwary, Andrzej Zabawa

Soviet Union
Zinetula Bilyaletdinov, Nikolai Drozdetsky,  Viacheslav Fetisov, Alexander Geramisov, Alexei Kasatonov, Andrei Khomutov, Vladimir Kovin, Aleksandr Kozhevnikov, Vladimir Krutov, Igor Larionov, Sergei Makarov, Vladimir Myshkin, Vasili Pervukhin, Sergei Shepelev, Alexander Skvortsov, Sergei Starikov, Igor Stelnov, Vladislav Tretiak, Viktor Tyumenev, Mikhail Vasiliev

Sweden
Thomas Åhlén, Per-Erik Eklund, Thom Eklund, Bo Ericsson, Håkan Eriksson, Peter Gradin, Mats Hessel, Michael Hjälm, Göran Lindblom, Tommy Mörth, Håkan Nordin, Rolf Ridderwall, Jens Öhling, Thomas Rundqvist, Tomas Sandström, Håkan Södergren, Mats Thelin, Michael Thelvén, Mats Waltin, Göte Wälitalo

United States
Marc Behrend, Scott Bjugstad, Bob Brooke, Chris Chelios, Mark Fusco, Scott Fusco, Steven Griffith, Paul Guay, John Harrington, Tom Hirsch, Al Iafrate, David A. Jensen, David H. Jensen, Mark Kumpel, Pat LaFontaine, Bob Mason, Corey Millen, Ed Olczyk, Gary Sampson, Phil Verchota

West Germany
Manfred Ahne, Ignaz Berndaner, Michael Betz, Bernhard Englbrecht, Karl Friesen, Dieter Hegen, Ulrich Hiemer, Ernst Höfner, Udo Kießling, Harold Kreis, Marcus Kuhl, Erich Kühnhackl, Andreas Niederberger, Franz Reindl, Joachim Reil, Roy Roedger, Peter Scharf, Helmut Steiger, Gerd Truntschka, Manfred Wolf

Yugoslavia
Igor Beribak, Mustafa Bešić, Dejan Burnik, Marjan Gorenc, Eduard Hafner, Gorazd Hiti, Drago Horvat, Peter Klemenc, Jože Kovač, Vojko Lajovec, Tomaž Lepša, Blaž Lomovšek, Drago Mlinarec, Murajica Pajić, Cveto Pretnar, Bojan Razpet, Ivan Ščap, Matjaž Sekelj, Zvone Šuvak, Andrej Vidmar

References

Sources

Hockey Hall Of Fame page on the 1984 Olympics

rosters
1984